In enzymology, chlorophyll synthase is an enzyme that catalyzes the chemical reaction

chlorophyllide a + phytyl diphosphate  chlorophyll a + diphosphate

The two substrates of this enzyme are chlorophyllide a and phytyl diphosphate; its two products are chlorophyll a and diphosphate. The same enzyme can act on chlorophyllide b to form chlorophyll b and similarly for chlorophyll d and f.

This enzyme belongs to the family of transferases, specifically those transferring aryl or alkyl groups other than methyl groups.  The systematic name of this enzyme class is chlorophyllide-a:phytyl-diphosphate phytyltransferase. This reaction is the final step of the complete biosynthetic pathway to chlorophylls from glutamic acid.

See also 
 Biosynthesis of chlorophylls

References

Further reading 

 
 
 

EC 2.5.1
Enzymes of unknown structure